The St. Martin de Porres Hospital is a hospital in Eikwe, in the Western Region of Ghana. It is established in 1959 by the Archdiocese of Cape Coast and it is owned and managed by the Catholic Church of Ghana.  In the 1930s the facilities served as a maternity home and orphanage.

There are also St. Martin de Porres hospitals in Agroyesum and Agormanya.

References

Hospitals in Ghana
Hospitals established in 1959